The American Contract Bridge League (ACBL) is a governing body for contract bridge in the United States, Canada, Mexico, and Bermuda. It is the largest such organization in North America having the stated mission "to promote, grow and sustain the game of bridge and serve the bridge-related interests of our Members." Its major activities are:
 sanctioning games at local bridge clubs and regional events
 certifying bridge teachers and club directors
 conducting the North American Bridge Championships (NABC)
 providing education materials and services
 administering the ACBL masterpoints system for tracking player performance
 providing oversight for ethical behavior and play
Besides representing the interests of its members with the World Bridge Federation,

, it had more than 165,000 members.

History
The ACBL was created in 1937 by the merger of the American Bridge League and the United States Bridge Association in 1937. At that time, its bridge tournaments were open only to white people, with the American Bridge Association running tournaments in which black people were allowed to play. In 1967, the American Contract Bridge League (ACBL) removed the final obstacle to ACBL membership for African-Americans when it included in its by-laws a rule that no person could be denied membership because of race, color, or creed

Headquarters
A not-for-profit organization, the ACBL was founded on December 23, 1937 in New York City and later moved its company headquarters to Greenwich, Connecticut, then to Memphis, Tennessee in 1971 and to Horn Lake, Mississippi in 2010. It has a full-time staff of about 60 employees in Horn Lake, plus about 160 tournament directors throughout the country. The headquarters also houses the League's Museum, Library and League's Hall of Fame.

North American Bridge Championships (NABC)
Three times a year, in the spring, summer, and fall, the ACBL holds the North American Bridge Championships (NABC) using the duplicate bridge method of scoring, which greatly reduces the element of luck in competition. The NABC typically extends over eleven days and includes many different events. The location of the NABC is rotated among major cities, attended by thousands of players. The 2009 Summer Nationals in Washington, DC had 14,115 total tables played over the 11 days.

Masterpoints
For many, the most significant role of the ACBL is its sanctioning of club games and tournaments to award masterpoints. If an event has the ACBL sanction, then the highest-finishing players are awarded specified numbers of masterpoints, which can be recorded with the ACBL.  Most players value the increase in their masterpoint total as a measure of their success at the game.  Unlike the Elo rating system developed for chess, the masterpoint system is strictly one of accumulation.  A player's masterpoint total can never decline except as part of a penalty imposed for ethics violations.

Education and support
Members receive the monthly Bridge Bulletin magazine.

In addition to the Laws of Duplicate Bridge (named Laws of Duplicate Contract Bridge until 2008), the ACBL offers many other training and information resources at its official website including software supporting education and play of the game,

The ACBL has also published the ACBL Bridge Series, a series of books written by Audrey Grant and designed to teach the game to beginners, as well as to help more experienced players review and expand upon their knowledge of the game.

Total Club Table Count

Districts
The ACBL consists of 25 Districts. Each District elects a District Director (DD) who serves a three-year term on the ACBL Board of Directors.
Clicking on the district number brings up the web site for that District. Clicking on the Report brings up the District Director report.

See also
 ACBL Hall of Fame
 American Bridge Association
 List of American bridge players
 List of Canadian bridge players
 List of Mexican bridge players
 List of bridge governing bodies
 North American Bridge Championships
 Canadian Bridge Federation
 United States Bridge Federation
 0-10,000 Fast Pairs
 0-10,000 NABC Pairs

References

External links
 
 75th Anniversary DVD part 1, part 2, part 3, published May 22–23, 2012 at YouTube

Contract bridge governing bodies
Bridge
Bridge
Contract bridge in the United States
Museums in DeSoto County, Mississippi
Amusement museums in the United States